The 2020 Campeonato Paulista Série A2 was the 27th season of the second level of the São Paulo state league under its current title and the 97th season overall.

Due to the ongoing COVID-19 pandemic, the season was indefinitely suspended on 16 March. Play was resumed on 19 August.  São Caetano and São Bento, two sides relegated from the first division in the previous season, won promotion back after one year. São Caetano were crowned champions on 12 October, after defeating the Sorocaba team 4–3 on penalties in the final, following a 3–3 aggregate score. São Caetano had already won the trophy in their last appearance in the second level, in 2017.

Team changes 
The following teams have changed division since the 2019 season.

To Série A2
Promoted from Série A3
 Audax
 Monte Azul

Relegated from Série A1
 Red Bull Brasil
 São Caetano
 São Bento

From Série A2
Promoted to Série A1
 Santo André
 Internacional de Limeira
 Água Santa

Relegated to Série A3
 Nacional
 Linense

Stadiums

League table

Knockout stage

Bracket

Season statistics

Top scorers

References 

Campeonato Paulista seasons
Paulista
Campeonato Paulista Série A3 2020